The Federation of Norwegian Enterprise  (formerly Handels- og Servicenæringens Hovedorganisasjon (HSH)) is an employers' organisation in Norway with more than 25,000 member companies.

It was established 1 of January 1990 through a merger. The headquarter is located at Solli plass in Frogner, Oslo.

The current chief executive is Bernt Gudmund Apeland. Chairman of the board is Margrethe Sunde.

References

Official site in English

Employers' organisations in Norway
1990 establishments in Norway
Organisations based in Oslo